The Nine Men was a council of citizens elected by the residents of New Netherland to advise its Director-General Peter Stuyvesant on the governance of the colony.  It replace the previous body, the Eight Men, which itself had superseded the Twelve Men. Members of this early form of representational democracy in North America were elected in 1647, 1649, 1650 and 1652. On July 26, 1649, eleven current and former members of the board signed the Petition of the Commonality of New Netherland, which requested that the Estates-General take action to encourage economic freedom and force local government like that in the Netherlands, removing the colony from the control of the Dutch West India Company. It became the basis for the municipal government when the city of New Amsterdam received its charter in 1653.

Members
Members and the year of election:

Key
 = Member of the council
 = Chairman

See also
Burgomaster
Voorleser
Schepen
Schout
Maryn Adriansen
Abraham Isaacsen Verplanck

References

Nonets

1647 establishments in the Dutch Empire